Colwyn Castle was a medieval castle near Llansantffraed in Wales. In the Manor of Glascwm, in the county of Radnorshire.It was built on the site of a Roman fort. The castle was captured in 1196 by Rhys ap Gruffydd, who was campaigning against the Normans. It was rebuilt in 1242 by Ralph de Mortimer to protect the lordship of Maelienydd, which he had recently acquired.

References

Sources

External links

Castles in Powys
Scheduled monuments in Wales